Richard J. Cunningham is a fictional character played by Ron Howard in the 1970s TV sitcom Happy Days. He is the second son of Howard and Marion Cunningham, brother of Joanie Cunningham and Chuck Cunningham, and a friend of Fonzie, Ralph Malph, and Potsie Weber. Richie was the original lead character, but was supplanted by Fonzie when that character's popularity came to dwarf that of Richie and the other characters (however, Ron Howard and Henry Winkler (Fonzie) continued to share top billing in the opening credits of the show).

Character traits
Richie Cunningham's personality was that of the quintessential All-American, 1950s teenager. With his red hair and freckles, he bore more than a passing resemblance to Howdy Doody (as noted in the episode "The Howdy Doody Show"). Occasionally he got into trouble, usually in some scheme designed to attract women, but he was never portrayed as malicious; instead, he was shown as wholesome and caring.

Many of the episodes revolved around Richie's attempts to pick up women. Despite his demeanor as a clean-cut teenager, he was not above scheming to get a date. Examples of his previous attempts include buying a new car and joining a local gang. Whenever he was feeling particularly lucky—especially when he spotted a prospective girlfriend—he would sing Fats Domino's "I found my thrill...on Blueberry Hill". When he became angry or annoyed, he would call any nemesis "bucko", even going as far as calling Fonzie this on several occasions. He even called his father, Howard, "bucko" once, in anger, though he quickly apologized for it.

Richie also harbored an enormous ambition as a writer. He first wrote for the Jefferson High Bugle, and then later became a cub reporter for the Milwaukee Journal, although in the first-season episode "Because She's There" he told his blind date, Phyllis, that he wanted to eventually go to law school and become a lawyer.

Throughout the series' run, Richie remained best friends with Fonzie, Ralph Malph, and Potsie Weber. He was always ready to help any of these friends if they got into trouble. He also looked after his younger sister Joanie as she grew up. In the first season, it was revealed that he and Potsie were best friends and grew up together since childhood; this was alluded to again in the seventh-season episode, "A Potsie Is Born."

After high school, Richie went to the University of Wisconsin–Milwaukee and soon met his girlfriend and future wife Lori Beth Allen in a library. Richie studied journalism at the university and always remained alert for any opportunity to further his writing career.

After graduating from the University of Wisconsin–Milwaukee; he, along with Ralph, served a short stint in the U.S. Army and was stationed in Greenland. While overseas, he married Lori Beth by telephone, with Fonzie standing in as proxy for the absent Richie. Lori Beth visited Richie in Greenland long enough to get pregnant. Their son was named Richie Jr.

In the final season of the series, Richie (with Lori Beth and Richie Jr.) and Ralph returned home from the Army. Howard had got Richie a job as a reporter for the Milwaukee Journal, something Richie had always wanted, but Richie had a new dream of becoming a screenwriter. Richie moved to Hollywood with Lori Beth and his child to find work as a screenwriter. They later returned in the series finale for Joanie and Chachi's wedding.

Cultural references
In Austin Powers: International Man of Mystery, Austin, going undercover, goes by the alias "Richie Cunningham".

In the TV series Dawson's Creek, Pacey likens Dawson to Richie Cunningham (in the first season ninth episode).

In the TV series True Story with Ed & Randall, Gastor describes the police officer who pulls him over as Richie Cunningham (in the first season sixth episode).

References

External links

Happy Days characters
Fictional characters from Milwaukee
Fictional reporters
Fictional United States Army personnel
Fictional writers
Television characters introduced in 1972
Teenage characters in television
American male characters in television

sv:Richard Cunningham